David Lee (born February 16, 1961) is an American unit still photographer.

He is the younger brother of film director Spike Lee, and has done the still photography for all of his older brother's feature films before 2013 with the exception of Get on the Bus and He Got Game. Other films he has done still photography for include The Preacher's Wife, The Best Man, Pollock, Made, Eternal Sunshine of the Spotless Mind, American Gangster and the television series The Wire.

References

External links

1961 births
Living people
African-American photographers
American photographers
Movie stills photographers
People from Brooklyn
Lee family (show business)
21st-century African-American people
20th-century African-American people